Felony & Mayhem Press is an American book publisher which specializes in re-issues of out-of-print mystery novels, first paperback editions of books previously published in hardcover, and U.S. editions of books that initially came out overseas. All Felony & Mayhem imprints are trade paperbacks. The company was called "the most dastardly local press" in the Village Voice's Best of New York 2008 issue.

Felony & Mayhem initially distributed only through independent bookstores and catalog sales, but later expanded distribution to major retailers. In 2005, the company's first catalog featured only twelve titles  including Caroline Graham's The Killings at Badger's Drift, and Reginald Hill's Who Guards a Prince?. In 2009, the Felony & Mayhem catalog listed more than 125 titles.

Founder
Maggie Topkis (born February 8, 1960 in New York City). Prior to establishing Mayhem, she was the co-owner of New York bookseller Partners and Crime, which closed in 2012.   for over 15 years and had been the editor of a financial magazine.

References

External links
 Felony & Mayhem Press website

Book publishing companies based in New York (state)
Publishing companies established in 2005